The 1906 College Basketball All-American team, as chosen retroactively by the Helms Athletic Foundation. The player highlighted in gold was chosen as the Helms Foundation College Basketball Player of the Year retroactively in 1944.

See also
 1905–06 collegiate men's basketball season in the United States

References

NCAA Men's Basketball All-Americans
All-Americans